Double Dutch is the debut full-length album of Baton Rouge, Louisiana, based indie pop group The Eames Era. It was released shortly after the band members' graduation from Louisiana State University, symbolizing the work put into the album and the newfangled maturity of the band.

Track listing
 Go To Sleep –- 4:10
 Got Your Note –- 2:31
 I Don't Mind –- 3:24
 Listen For The Sun –- 3:25
 Washed Out –- 2:54
 Pay Attention –- 2:28
 Talk Talk –- 3:08
 Old Folks –- 2:32
 Year of the Waitress –- 3:21
 Boy Came In –- 2:31
 Promises –- 3:36

2005 debut albums
The Eames Era albums